Voreas Hokkaido is a men's volleyball club in Japan. It currently plays in V.League Division 2. This clus is located in Asahikawa city, Hokkaido.

History 
Voreas Hokkaido was established in October, 2016. It's Japan's first profesional volleyball club. 

The club joined V.League on July 1 2017. Later, the club won the first title of 2017–18 Season of V·Challenge League II.

After the new born V.League, it participated in V.League Division 3 for 2018–19 Season. Voreas Hokkaido managed to win the title and promoted to Division 2 for next season. 

Voreas Hokkaido took 2nd place of 2019–20 Season and supposed to take part in V.Challenge match that could be promoted to Division 1 if it won the match. However, the V.Challenge match was suspended due to COVID-19 pandemic.

Voreas Hokkaido won the title of 2021–22 Season V.League Division 2 Men's for the first time. But it failed to promote to Division 1 as they lost the V.Challenge matach against VC Nagano Tridents.

Voreas Hokkaido won the 1st place of the 2022-23 season in the V.League Division 2 Men's Regular Round for the second year in a row with 22 wins and only 2 losses.

Achievements

V.League Division 2
Champions(1): 2021–22
Runners-up(1): 2019–20, 2020–21
V.League Division 3/V.Challenge League II
Champions(1): 2018–19

Team

Current roster

References

External links 
Team profile on V.League (In Japanese)

Japanese volleyball teams
Volleyball clubs established in 2016